Mukhtar Shakhanov (Muhtar Şahanov) (born 2 July 1942 in Otrar, Kazakhstan) is a prominent Kazakh writer, lawmaker, and the Kazakh ambassador to Kyrgyzstan. He is also a Member of Parliament for Majilis, as well as editor-in-chief of the magazine Zhalyn.

Well known in Kazakhstan for his articles, which raised public awareness of the need for the protection of the Aral Sea has earned him worldwide recognition and leading the commission on Jeltoqsan tragedy.

See also
Jeltoqsan

References

External links
Mr. Mukhtar Shakhanov, Kazakh ambassador to Kyrgyzstan, Visit the Kansai Soka School System.
To Remember Jeltoksan Lessons.

Living people
1942 births
Members of the Mazhilis
Kazakhstani writers
Ambassadors of Kazakhstan to Kyrgyzstan